Lists of awards cover awards given in various fields, including arts and entertainment, sports and hobbies, the humanities, science and technology, business, and service to society.
A given award may be found in more than one list.
Awards may be given by a government agency, an association such as the International Cricket Council, a company, a magazine such as Motor Trend, or an organization like Terrapinn Holdings that runs events. Some awards have significant financial value, while others mainly provide recognition. The lists include awards that are no longer being given.

By subject area

Arts and entertainment

Business and industry

Education

Humanities

Recreation

Service to society

Sciences

Natural sciences

Social sciences

By awarding entity

By type of recipient

Other criteria

Miscellaneous awards